Sheffield University Bankers Hockey Club is a hockey club based in Sheffield, South Yorkshire, England.  It is associated with the University of Sheffield men's and women's hockey clubs, and many of its players are current students or alumni of the University of Sheffield.  It is often abbreviated as SUBHC.

History 
Sheffield University Bankers Hockey Club came from a merger of the University of Sheffield Men/Women's hockey clubs' Saturday teams and the well-established Sheffield Bankers Hockey Club in the year 2000, for reasons of mutual benefit.

The Sheffield Bankers club was formed in the 1920s and originally played at Abbeydale Park.  Up until just after World War II only bank employees were allowed to play.  When hockey moved to astroturf in the 1980s, the club moved out to the Concord Sports Centre, before moving to the University of Sheffield facilities at Goodwin Sports Centre.

Teams 
With over 100 players, the club currently supports 7 Men's XI and 3 Ladies' XIs playing at a wide range of ability levels.

The Men's 1st XI play in the North Hockey Association Men's Premier league, with the 2nd XI in North Hockey Association Men's League 2 (East).

The Ladies 1st XI currently play in the Yorkshire Hockey Association Division 3 league, while the recently reactivated 2nd XI plays in Division 7 (Yorkshire).

Club 
The Sheffield University Banker's Hockey Club plays most of its games on the Goodwin Astroturf pitches at the University of Sheffield, but also plays games at local schools, including Tapton School and King Edward VII School (Sheffield).  It does not have a purpose-built clubhouse like many similar sized sports clubs, so it uses a local public house 'The Cobden View', in Crookes, for post match meetings and social purposes.

The Club is one of England Hockey's 4 National Performance Centres (NPCs), providing funding for improved training facilities and selection/support of potential England team players.

References

External links 
Official Website
Slazenger England Hockey League
North Hockey Association
Yorkshire Hockey Association

English field hockey clubs
Field hockey clubs established in 2000
Sports teams and clubs in Sheffield
Sport in Sheffield
Sport in South Yorkshire
Field hockey in Yorkshire
2000 establishments in England
Sheff